Dolores Camarillo (March 31, 1910 – February 8, 1988) was a Mexican character actress of film, television, and theater. She also was a makeup artist for films, and was frequently billed as "Fraustita".

Personal life
The daughter of actors, Camarillo was a makeup artist for films in the 1930s. She was also a makeup teacher in the Andrés Soler Institute.
She was married to fellow film actor Antonio R. Frausto, to whom she owed her professional nickname of "Fraustita", or meaning "little woman Frausto".

Career
Camarillo debuted as an actress in 1915 in the theatrical play, La cara de Dios (The Face of God). She appeared in 124 films from 1933 to 1986. One of her most prominent roles in her film career is that of "Paz" in the popular 1940 Cantinflas film Ahí está el detalle. In the film, she received the sixth billing, after her other co-stars. She also appeared in supporting roles with actor Joaquín Pardavé in the Lebanese character comedies El baisano Jalil (1942) and El barchante Neguib (1946).

Filmography

 The Coward (1939)
El indio (1939) ... Panchita
 Here's the Point (1940) ... Paz
El baisano Jalil (1942) ... Sofía
The Black Angel (1942)
My Memories of Mexico (1942) ... Conchita, Portera
 Beautiful Michoacán (1943)
El barchante Neguib (1946) ... Regina
 Midnight (1949)
 Philip of Jesus (1949)
When Children Sin (1952) ... Felipa
Remember to Live (1953) ... Margarita
School for Tramps (1955) ... Pancha, Servant
 My Mother Is Guilty (1960)
The Paper Man (1963)

References

External links

People from San Luis Potosí
20th-century Mexican actresses
1988 deaths
Golden Age of Mexican cinema
1910 births
Mexican film actresses
Mexican television actresses
Mexican stage actresses